is a train station in the city of Toyama, Toyama Prefecture, Japan.

Lines

Station layout 
The station has one ground-level side platform serving a single bi-directional track. The station is unattended

History
Shinjō-Tanaka Station was opened on 21 December 2012.

Passenger statistics
In fiscal 2015, the station was used by 136 passengers daily.

Adjacent stations

Surrounding area 
Japan National Route 41

See also
 List of railway stations in Japan

References

External links

 

Railway stations in Toyama Prefecture
Railway stations in Japan opened in 2012
Stations of Toyama Chihō Railway
Toyama (city)